Mycobacteriaceae is a family of bacteria in the phylum Actinomycetota. Its name is derived from the Mycobacterium genus, which includes pathogens known to cause serious diseases in mammals, including tuberculosis (M. tuberculosis) and leprosy (M. leprae) in humans. The Greek prefix myco- means 'fungus', alluding to this genus' mold-like colony surfaces.

Phylogeny
The phylogeny is based on whole-genome analysis.

Notes

References

Mycobacteriales
Bacteria families